Wagner Diniz Gomes de Araújo (born September 21, 1983 in Maceió), or simply Wagner Diniz, is a Brazilian right back.

Honours
Treze
Campeonato Paraibano: 2005

América
 Campeonato Carioca Série B: 2015

References

External links
CBF   

placar 
globoesporte.globo.com 
netvasco.com.br 
crvascodagama 

1983 births
Living people
Brazilian footballers
Campeonato Brasileiro Série A players
Clube de Regatas Brasil players
Treze Futebol Clube players
CR Vasco da Gama players
São Paulo FC players
Santos FC players
Club Athletico Paranaense players
Itumbiara Esporte Clube players
Avaí FC players
São Bernardo Futebol Clube players
Marília Atlético Clube players
America Football Club (RJ) players
Atlético Rio Negro Clube players
Association football defenders
People from Maceió
Sportspeople from Alagoas